Han Kaeo is a tambon (subdistrict) of Hang Dong District, in Chiang Mai Province, Thailand. In 2020 it had a total population of 5,819 people.

Administration

Central administration
The tambon is subdivided into 9 administrative villages (muban).

Local administration
The whole area of the subdistrict is covered by the subdistrict municipality (Thesaban Tambon) Han Kaeo (เทศบาลตำบลหารแก้ว).

References

External links
Thaitambon.com on Han Kaeo

Tambon of Chiang Mai province
Populated places in Chiang Mai province